Daan Soete (born 19 December 1994) is a Belgian cyclo-cross and road cyclist, who currently rides for UCI Cyclo-cross team Group Hens–Maes Containers. He competed in the men's under-23 event at the 2016 UCI Cyclo-cross World Championships in Heusden-Zolder.

Major results

Cyclo-cross

2014–2015
 UCI Under-23 World Cup
1st Koksijde
 2nd Under-23 Oostmalle
2015–2016
 Under-23 BPost Bank Trophy
1st Sint-Niklaas
2nd Hamme
3rd Loenhout
 1st Under-23 Oostmalle
 2nd National Under-23 Championships
 2nd Under-23 Overijse
 Under-23 Superprestige
2nd Hoogstraten
 UCI Under-23 World Cup
3rd Koksijde
2016–2017
 Toi Toi Cup
2nd Slany
 2nd Bensheim
 2nd Pétange
2017–2018
 Toi Toi Cup
1st Unicov
 1st Contern
 3rd National Championships
 UCI World Cup
3rd Waterloo
2018–2019
 Brico Cross
1st Lokeren
3rd Geraardsbergen
 2nd Waterloo
2019–2020
 UCI World Cup
3rd Iowa City
2021–2022
 1st Waterloo
 2nd Fae' Di Oderzo
 Ethias Cross
3rd Beringen
2022–2023
 2nd Waterloo

Road
2017
 1st  Mountains classification, Ster ZLM Toer
2021
 1st Prologue Oberösterreich Rundfahrt
2022
 1st Prologue Oberösterreich Rundfahrt

References

External links

1994 births
Living people
Cyclo-cross cyclists
Belgian male cyclists
Place of birth missing (living people)
21st-century Belgian people